Paul Davidson Sørensen (born 1934) is an American botanist.

Authority abbreviation

References

1934 births
American botanists
Living people
Place of birth missing (living people)
Date of birth missing (living people)